César Bernardo Arévalo de León (born 7 October 1957) is a Guatemalan politician, diplomat, sociologist and writer. He has been a deputy in the Congress of Guatemala since 2020, previously he was Guatemalan Ambassador to Spain (1995–1996) and Deputy Minister of Foreign Affairs (1994–1995).

Arévalo de León was born in 1957 in Guatemala City, the son of former Guatemalan President Juan José Arévalo Bermejo and his second wife, Margarita de León.

References 

1957 births
Living people
People from Guatemala City
Guatemalan politicians
Members of the Congress of Guatemala
Guatemalan diplomats
Guatemalan writers
Guatemalan sociologists
Guatemalan academics
Ambassadors of Guatemala to Spain
Hebrew University of Jerusalem alumni
Utrecht University alumni
Children of national leaders